The Deutscher Amateur Radio Club e.V.  (DARC) (in English, German Amateur Radio Club) is a national non-profit organization for amateur radio enthusiasts in Germany.  As of 9 July 2019, the organization had 34,009 members, approximately 53% of all licensed amateur radio operators in Germany.  Key membership benefits of the organization include QSL bureau services, a monthly membership magazine called CQ DL, and the promotion and sponsorship of radio contests.  DARC promotes amateur radio by organizing classes and technical support to help enthusiasts earn their amateur radio license.  The DARC also represents the interests of German amateur radio operators and shortwave listeners before German and international telecommunications regulatory authorities.  DARC is the national member society representing Germany in the International Amateur Radio Union.

See also 
International Amateur Radio Union
List of amateur radio repeater sites in Germany

References

External links
 DARC home-page
 CQ-DL home-page

Germany
Communications and media organisations based in Germany
Organizations established in 1950
1950 establishments in Germany
Radio in Germany
Non-profit organisations based in Hesse